The ATP Tashkent Open is a defunct ATP Tour affiliated men's tennis tournament played from 1997 to 2002. It was held in Tashkent in Uzbekistan and was played on outdoor hard courts.

Although no ATP 250 level tournaments have been played in Tashkent since then, there is, since 2008, a Challenger event played in Tashkent, the Tashkent Challenger.

Finals

Singles

Doubles

See also
 Tashkent Open – Women's tennis tournament

References

 
Hard court tennis tournaments
Tennis tournaments in Uzbekistan
Tashkent
Recurring sporting events established in 1997
Recurring sporting events disestablished in 2002
1997 establishments in Uzbekistan
Defunct tennis tournaments in Asia
Sport in Tashkent
Defunct sports competitions in Uzbekistan
2002 disestablishments in Uzbekistan